Pillitteri is an Italian surname. Notable people with the surname include:

Gary Pillitteri (born 1936), Canadian politician
Paolo Pillitteri (born 1940), Italian politician and film critic

Italian-language surnames